Ernest Schofield (born 29 March 1921) was an English professional footballer who played as an inside forward.

Career
Born in Sheffield, Schofield moved from Sheffield Wednesday to Bradford City in June 1945. He scored 1 goal in 1 league appearance for the club, and made a further 2 FA Cup appearances without scoring, before being released in 1947.

Notes

Sources

References

1921 births
Date of death missing
English footballers
Sheffield Wednesday F.C. players
Bradford City A.F.C. players
English Football League players
Association football inside forwards